We Could Be Heroes is a 2018 Moroccan documentary sport film directed by Hind Bensari and produced by Habib Attia and Vibeke Vogel for Bullitt Films. The film focused on the life of Azeddine Nouiri, the Paralympic shot put champion, who overcame his physical challenges to be selected to 2016 Rio Paralympic Games along with his childhood friend Youssef.

The film premiered on 2 May 2018 at the Scotiabank Theatre. The film received positive reviews and won several awards at international film festivals. The film won the Jury Prize at the Hot Docs Canadian International Documentary Festival. The film also won the "Best International Documentary Award" at the Toronto International Film Festival. The film won Grand Prix at the Tangier National Film Festival.

Cast
 Azeddine Nouiri

References

External links
 
 We Could Be Heroes on Facebook

2018 films
Moroccan documentary films
Morocco at the Paralympics
2016 Summer Paralympics
Documentary films about sportspeople with disability